Jabar is a small village in the vicinity of Tordher, District Swabi, Pakistan.

Populated places in Swabi District